Toowong railway station is located on the Main line in Queensland, Australia. It serves the Brisbane suburb of Toowong. It is the closest station to the St Lucia campus of the University of Queensland.

History
Toowong station opened on 14 June 1875. The station was submerged during the 1893 floods.

The station was rebuilt in 1960 as part of the quadruplication of the line. In the 1980s, the air rights were sold and redeveloped as the Toowong Village shopping centre.

Services
Toowong is served by City network services operating from Nambour, Caboolture, Kippa-Ring and Bowen Hills to Springfield Central, Ipswich and Rosewood.

Services by platform

*Note: One weekday morning service (4:56am from Central) and selected afternoon peak services continue through to Rosewood.  At all other times, a change of train is required at Ipswich.

References

External links

Toowong station Queensland Rail
Toowong station Queensland's Railways on the Internet

Railway stations in Brisbane
Railway stations in Australia opened in 1875
Toowong
Main Line railway, Queensland